Magrane is a surname. It is a variant of MacGrane or McGrane, which derives from MagRaighne, which devolves to "Mag" (son of) and "Rayne", a hypocorism of Raghnall or Reginald.

Notable people with the surname include:
Patrick Byrne Magrane (1852–1933), Irish-American businessman
Joe Magrane (born 1964), American baseball player and broadcaster
Shannon Magrane (born 1995), American singer

See also
McGrane
McGrann

fr:Magrane